North Dakota Highway 25 (ND 25) is a  north–south state highway in the U.S. state of North Dakota. ND 25's southern terminus is at Interstate 94 (I-94) and I-94 Business west of Bismarck, and the northern terminus is at ND 31 west of Center.

Major intersections

References

025
Transportation in Morton County, North Dakota
Transportation in Oliver County, North Dakota